WASP-28b is an extrasolar planet discovered in 2010 by the Wide Angle Search for Planets (WASP) project orbiting WASP-28, a magnitude 12 star also known as 1SWASP J233427.87-013448.1 and 2MASS J23342787-0134482. Since it orbits its star very closely, the planet is a strongly irradiated hot Jupiter. As seen from the Earth, WASP-28b transits its host star every 3.41 days taking about 3 hours to do so.

The planet was observed by the Kepler spacecraft during the K2 mission engineering campaign in February 2014 as part of an early science demonstration. It was also observed from December 2016 to March 2017 during K2's campaign 12 which allowed a refinement of the system parameters.

Internal structure
The planet seems to be a gas giant with a low core mass (<~10M(Earth)) and a low heavy elements content (Z<~0.2).

References

External links
 
 WASP Planets

Exoplanets discovered by WASP
Exoplanets discovered in 2010
Giant planets
Hot Jupiters
Transiting exoplanets